Eilema melasonea is a moth of the subfamily Arctiinae. It was described by George Hampson in 1903. It is found in Ethiopia and Kenya.

References

melasonea
Moths described in 1903
Moths of Africa